Leonard Jervis (born 19 April 1949) is a Bahamian sprinter. He competed in the men's 100 metres at the 1976 Summer Olympics.

References

1949 births
Living people
Athletes (track and field) at the 1976 Summer Olympics
Bahamian male sprinters
Olympic athletes of the Bahamas
Place of birth missing (living people)